

The Tat Khalsa (Gurmukhi: ਤੱਤ ਖਾਲਸਾ, translit. Tata khālasā), also romanised as Tatt Khalsa, known as the Akal Purkhias during the 18th century, was a Sikh faction that arose from the schism following the passing of Guru Gobind Singh in 1708, led by his widow Mata Sundari, opposed to the religious innovations of Banda Singh Bahadur and his followers.

Banda Bahadur, in the flush of an initial string of victories against the Mughal governor of Sirhind, made changes to the Khalsa tradition that were opposed by the orthodox Khalsa as heretical. These included requiring his followers to be vegetarian, replacing the traditional Khalsa garment color of blue with red garments, replacing the traditional Khalsa salute of "Waheguru Ji ka Khalsa, Waheguru Ji ki Fateh" with the salute "Fateh Darshan, Fateh Dharam" and most controversial to the Sikhs, allowing his followers to treat him as a guru, in direct contradiction to the precept of Guru Maneyo Granth laid out by Guru Gobind Singh before his passing. After the last defensive battle against the Mughal Army, many prominent Sikh veterans, including Binod Singh and his son Kahn Singh, along with much of the Khalsa, parted ways with Banda Singh; the Sikhs loyal to Guru Gobind Singh were referred to as the Tatt Khalsa (tatt meaning "ready," "pure," or "true,"); those who accepted the changes were called Bandai Sikhs or Bandai Khalsa. The schism persisted after Banda Singh's torture and execution at Delhi in 1716.

After the assassination of the Mughal emperor Farrukh Siyar in 1719, Sikh persecution lessened enough to allow for occasional general meetings at Amritsar, where the Bandai faction demanded 50% of the income from donations and offerings at the Darbar Sahib, which the Tatt Khalsa refused as baseless. Mata Sundari, in Delhi upon hearing of the rising tensions, dispatched Bhai Mani Singh with six other Sikhs to manage the Darbar Sahib, with the instruction that the entire income of the gurdwara go to Guru ka Langar. On Vaisakhi 1721, the Bandai faction fortified their camp in preparation for conflict, though both factions agreed to mediation offered by Mani Singh, agreeing to the determination of the site: Two slips of paper, each with one of the factions' salutes written on them, were dropped in the sarovar, or pool surrounding the gurdwara; the traditional Khalsa salute surfaced first, and many Bandais immediately bowed and came to the Khalsa side, though some objected to the validity of the mediation. A wrestling match in front of the Akal Takht between representatives of each faction was then agreed to, with Tatt Khalsa represented by Miri Singh, son of the Khalsa leader Kahn Singh, and Sangat Singh, the son of the Bandai leader Lahaura Singh. After Miri Singh's victory, and that of the Tatt Khalsa, the bulk of remaining Bandais joined the Khalsa side, and the few remaining holdouts were driven away, ending the schism.

Singh Sabha 

Later, the name would be used by the dominant Singh Sabha faction in Lahore founded in 1879 to rival the Amritsar Singh Sabha. The name was used to connote Sikhs with full readiness and commitment to action on behalf of the Sikh community, in contrast to ḍhillaṛ, or "indolent, passive, ineffectual" Sikhs.

The leader of the Tat Khalsa Singh Sabha was Gurmukh Singh, a professor at the Oriental College of Lahore. He contacted Kahn Singh Nabha, a notable scholar, who wrote Mahan Kosh (encyclopedia of Sikhism) and Ham Hindu Nahin (We are not Hindus). Bhai Gurmukh Singh and Kahn Singh Nabha later mentored Max Arthur Macauliffe, a divisional judge, to undertake the translation of Granth Sahib (finished in 1909).

See also
 Khalsa Akhbar Lahore
 Sects of Sikhism

References

Literature
 Oberoi, Harjot, The Construction of Religious Boundaries. Culture, Identity and Diversity in the Sikh Tradition, New Delhi 1994.

External links
 The Better Half of Sikh History
 Tat Khalsa Singh Sabha

Religious organizations established in 1879
Sikh politics
Sikh organisations